Family Flight is an American television movie that originally aired on ABC on October 25, 1972. The film stars Rod Taylor and centers on a family whose plane crash-lands in the Baja California peninsula.  The film was one of the first times Taylor was cast to play a father.

Plot
A family on a small plane gets caught in a storm and crash lands in the desert. Short on food and water they manage to repair the plane. But the attempt is ruined by a family member draining the battery by falling asleep listening to the plane's FM radio the night before takeoff.  After admonishing the boy, the father attempts to manually start the plane from spinning the propeller with his arms.  The plane starts but the propeller lacerated the father's arm severely.  The family takes off with the son at the controls and attempt to land on a nearby aircraft carrier!  They fail and have to try again.  In the end they are rescued and the father is given emergency surgery by the ship's hospital.

Cast
 Rod Taylor as Jason Carlyle
 Dina Merrill as Florence Carlyle
 Kristoffer Tabori as David Carlyle
 Janet Margolin as Carol Rutledge
 Gene Nelson as Aircraft Carrier Captain
 Richard Roat as Officer of the Deck
 Paul Kent as First Controller
 James Sikking as Second Controller
 Bill Zuckert as Frank Gross
 Ed Begley Jr. as Driver

Reception
Howard Thompson gave Family Flight a positive review in The New York Times, praising Rod Taylor's "fine, gutsy performance" and the "credible precision of the climax." New York Magazine also praised the "strong performances" and labelled it "a good adventure story".

References

External links
 

1972 films
1972 television films
American television films
American aviation films
Films directed by Marvin J. Chomsky
Films produced by Harve Bennett
Films set in Mexico
1970s American films